Kukushtan is a rural locality (a settlement) and the administrative center of Kukushtanskoye Rural Settlement, Permsky District, Perm Krai, Russia. The population was 5,650 as of 2010. There are 118 streets.

Geography 
Kukushtan is located 50 km south of Perm (the district's administrative centre) by road. Klyuchiki is the nearest rural locality.

References 

Rural localities in Permsky District